The Bronze Stalk Trophy is presented to the winner of the annual college football game between Mid-American Conference rivals Northern Illinois University in DeKalb, Illinois and Ball State University in Muncie, Indiana. The two interstate rivals began competing for this trophy in 2008.

Designed by nationally recognized sculptor and DeKalb artist Renee Bemis, the trophy depicts several cornstalks in tribute to the prevalence of maize around the respective home states of the rivals.

The first meeting between the two occurred in 1941, a 6–6 tie; the Huskies lead the all-time series 25–23–2, having won 17 of the last 22 meetings. Ball State won the inaugural contest for the Bronze Stalk at Scheumann Stadium in 2008, with Northern Illinois winning the trophy for the first time the following season on Brigham Field at Huskie Stadium.

Game results

See also 
 List of NCAA college football rivalry games

References

College football rivalry trophies in the United States
Ball State Cardinals football
Northern Illinois Huskies football